The 8th Arabian Gulf Cup was held in the Manama, Bahrain in March 1986.

The tournament was won by Kuwait, claiming their 6th title.

Iraq participated with the B team.

Tournament

The teams played a single round-robin style competition. The team achieving first place in the overall standings was the tournament winner.

Result

References

1986
1986
1986 in Asian football
1985–86 in Iraqi football
1985–86 in Saudi Arabian football
1985–86 in Emirati football
1985–86 in Kuwaiti football
1985–86 in Qatari football
1985–86 in Bahraini football
1985–86 in Omani football